Rich Taylor (born 1954) is an American politician who served as a member of the Iowa Senate for the 42nd district from 2013 to 2021. A Democrat, he also served as assistant Democratic leader.

Early life 
Born and raised in Mount Union, Iowa he graduated high school before joining Iowa National Guard.

Career 
After retiring from the National Guard, Taylor became an electrician. He worked for the Iowa State Penitentiary in Fort Madison for 26 years, where he was in charge of repairing and operating the heating, ventilation, air-conditioning and refrigeration systems.

Taylor assumed office 2013, flipping the district after the previous incumbent Shawn Hamerlinck lost renomination due to a sexual harassment lawsuit filed against him.

Taylor served as the ranking member of the Senate Veterans Affairs Committee. He was also a member of the Interstate Compact for Adult Offender Supervision State Council.

Personal life 
He resides near Mount Pleasant, Iowa with his wife Annette and their two children.

Electoral history

References 

Living people
1954 births
Republican Party Iowa state senators
21st-century American politicians